Ots-Toch (1600–c. 1640) was a Mohawk woman from Canajoharie, New York.  She married an early Dutch colonist, and her children became interpreters between the Mohawk nation and New Netherland.

Name 
As with so much of her life, the source for this name is unknown; contemporary records of New Netherland do not mention it. The name does not appear on paper until the 1800s, causing some to suspect that it is traditional rather than historical. As a matter of convenience, it is sometimes used by people who doubt is historicity.

Personal life 
Ots-Toch was born in or about 1600 near Canajoharie, New York, though according to some assessments of her life story, she was born considerably earlier. She married Dutch settler Cornelise Antonnisen Van Slyke and founded the Van Slyke family in New Netherland. She was married sometime around 1620 and died in 1646. Ots-Toch and Cornelise had at least 3 children who survived to adulthood and served as interpreters between the Mohawk nation and the Dutch, including Jacques Cornelius Van Slyck (Itsychosaquachka), Marten Maurice van Slyck, and Hillitie.

Family 
Little is known of Ots-Toch, although she is indirectly referenced in many histories of early New York. For example, her daughter, Hillitie, chose to live with the Dutch, but served as an official Mohawk interpreter. Ots-Toch had at least three other children with Cornelise Van Slyke, and may have had more children by a Mohawk father. Cornelise Van Slyke lived with the Mohawk according to matrilineal tradition, and he was chosen as an official delegate of New Netherlands to the Mohawk. Their children also became interpreters for the Mohawk.

Some variants of Ots-Toch's legend claim that her father was French, Jaques Hertel. It should be noted, however, that the fullest early record of her says that her daughter Hilletie and her son Jacques Van Slyck were "half-breeds", indicating mixed race, and there is no indication that Hilletie's staunchly anti-Christian mother was daughter of a French Catholic. This record, from a 1680 interview with Hilletie, appears in the "Journal of Jasper Danckaerts."  That journal and other records from her lifetime do not mention her name, which does not appear in accounts before the 19th century, leading some historians to question its authenticity. On the other hand, the Mohawk name of her son Jacques was documented by the Dutch during his lifetime.

Legacy 
In local lore, Ots-Toch is often compared to Pocahontas, another 17th century Native American who married a European colonist. But Pocahontas eventually moved to Great Britain and converted to Christianity, whereas Ots-Toch remained with the Mohawk and is reported to have rejected European religion. 

Like many of the people living in and around New Netherland, her life was scarcely documented, with not so much as a mention of her name. Most of what has been written about her is conjectural and based on oral tradition. If the name Ots-Toch is traditional rather than historical, one possible inspiration for it was the Mohawk god, Otskon (Ots-kon), who was mercurial in temperament, just as she was.

Notes

Sources

Colonial American women
American Mohawk people
17th-century Native American women
People from Canajoharie, New York

External links
Jacques Hertel in Legend and History

People of New Netherland